Henry Davis (November 1879 – 19 October 1945) was an English footballer during the late 1890s and early 1900s.

Career
His career started in non-League Football at Ardsley. He then became a part of the 1898–99 Barnsley squad in their first season in the Football League 2nd Division. His late goal against Luton Town secured the Reds' first ever league win.

On 22 January 1900, Davis moved to Sheffield Wednesday where he was part of two League Championship victories in the 1902–03 & 1903–04 seasons.

He won three caps for England, all during the Home Nations Championship of 1903. His only international goal came on his debut against Ireland on 14 February 1903.

External links

1879 births
1945 deaths
Sheffield Wednesday F.C. players
Barnsley F.C. players
English footballers
England international footballers
English Football League representative players
English Football League players
Association football wingers